Q Pootle 5 was a children's animated TV show that aired in 2013. It revolves around the main character, Q Pootle 5 and his adventures.

Q Pootle 5